Sunless may refer to :

Sunless (song cycle), by Modest Mussorgsky
Sans Soleil (Sunless), a 1982 film by Chris Marker, named after the song cycle
Sunless tanning
Sunless, A brooklyn based band.